Hucul is a surname. Notable people with the surname include:

Cliff Hucul (born 1948), Canadian racing driver
Fred Hucul (born 1931), Canadian ice hockey player
Jenni Hucul (born 1988), Canadian bobsledder
Sandy Hucul (born 1933), Canadian ice hockey player and coach

See also
Hochul (surname)